Joseph A. Flaherty, O.S.A. (June 13, 1916 – August 8, 1993) was a priest of the Order of Saint Augustine and 27th president of Villanova University from 1965 to 1967.  He was the son of James A. Flaherty, the sixth Supreme Knight of the Knights of Columbus.

References

1916 births
1993 deaths
Presidents of Villanova University
20th-century American clergy
20th-century American academics